The Ministry of Agriculture (MOA) is the government ministry responsible for the governance, management and promotion of agriculture in Liberia.  The Ministry is responsible for the oversight of agronomy, animal husbandry and other agriculture industries, the economic organization of the agriculture and food industries, and national food security.  The work of the Ministry is divided into sectors of Livestock Production, Agricultural Chemicals and Crop Production.

The current Minister of Agriculture is Hon. Jeanine Milly Cooper.  Main Ministry offices are located in Monrovia.

See also
 Agriculture in Liberia
 Economy of Liberia

References

External links
 
 Ministry of Agriculture, document 'National Food Security and Nutrition Strategy' March 2008

Government ministries of Liberia
Agriculture in Liberia
Liberia
Monrovia
Agricultural organizations based in Africa